The 2019 World's Best Racehorse Rankings, sponsored by Longines was the 2019 edition of the World's Best Racehorse Rankings. It was an assessment of Thoroughbred racehorses issued by the International Federation of Horseracing Authorities (IFHA) on 22 January 2020. It included horses aged three or older which competed in flat races during 2019. It was open to all horses irrespective of where they raced or were trained.

For the first time the rankings saw a three-way tie for first place between the European five-year-olds Crystal Ocean, Enable and Waldgeist. The top rating of 128 was the lowest in the history of the rankings. The top-rated three-year-old fillies Covfefe and Gran Alegria failed to make the top 100.

Rankings for 2019
For a detailed guide to this table, see below.

Guide
A complete guide to the main table above.

References

World Thoroughbred Racehorse Rankings
World Thoroughbred Rankings 2019